Rossie is a city in Clay County, Iowa,  United States. The population was 49 in the 2020 census, a decrease from 58 in 2000.

Geography
Rossie's longitude and latitude coordinates in decimal form are 43.013208, -95.189105.

Demographics

2010 census
As of the census of 2010, there were 70 people, 26 households, and 20 families living in the city. The racial makeup of the city was 95.7% White and 4.3% from two or more races. Hispanic or Latino of any race were 5.7% of the population.

There were 26 households, of which 38.5% had children under the age of 18 living with them, 57.7% were married couples living together, 3.8% had a female householder with no husband present, 15.4% had a male householder with no wife present, and 23.1% were non-families. 23.1% of all households were made up of individuals, and 3.8% had someone living alone who was 65 years of age or older. The average household size was 2.69 and the average family size was 3.00.

The median age in the city was 35.5 years. 30% of residents were under the age of 18; 8.6% were between the ages of 18 and 24; 32.9% were from 25 to 44; 24.3% were from 45 to 64; and 4.3% were 65 years of age or older. The gender makeup of the city was 52.9% male and 47.1% female.

2000 census
As of the census of 2000, there were 58 people, 22 households, and 15 families living in the city. The racial makeup of the city was 100.00% White.

There were 22 households, out of which 31.8% had children under the age of 18 living with them, 63.6% were married couples living together, and 27.3% were non-families. 22.7% of all households were made up of individuals, and 9.1% had someone living alone who was 65 years of age or older. The average household size was 2.64 and the average family size was 2.94.

In the city, the population was spread out, with 29.3% under the age of 18, 3.4% from 18 to 24, 36.2% from 25 to 44, 27.6% from 45 to 64, and 3.4% who were 65 years of age or older. The median age was 31 years. For every 100 females, there were 114.8 males. For every 100 females age 18 and over, there were 105.0 males.

The median income for a household in the city was $30,833, and the median income for a family was $41,250. Males had a median income of $29,219 versus $11,875 for females. The per capita income for the city was $13,266. There were 11.1% of families and 9.5% of the population living below the poverty line, including no under eighteens and none of those over 64.

Education
Clay Central–Everly Community School District operates public schools serving the community.

References

External links

 
City-Data Comprehensive statistical data and more about Rossie

Cities in Clay County, Iowa
Cities in Iowa